The Highland Society of London is a charity registered in England and Wales, with "the view of establishing and supporting schools in the Highlands and in the Northern parts of Great Britain, for relieving distressed Highlanders at a distance from their native homes, for preserving the antiquities and rescuing from oblivion the valuable remains of Celtic literature, and for promoting the improvement and general welfare of the Northern parts of Great Britain".

History

The Society was founded in 1778 by Highland gentlemen resident in London and was incorporated by Act of Parliament on 21 May 1816.

Within a year of its foundation, its members had come to include a number of notable Scots:
 Lord Macleod
 Sir Harry Monro
 Hon Archibald Fraser of Lovat
 Archibald Macdonald
 Hon. General Fraser (President)
 Lord Adam Gordon
 The Earl of Eglinton
 John Macpherson
 The Duke of Gordon
 The Duke of Atholl
 John Campbell of Calder
 The Earl of Seaforth
 Lord Frederick Campbell
 The Earl of Caithness
 Major-General Munro
 William Wemyss

The Presidents over the first 25 years of the Society's existence were:

 1778 Simon Fraser of Lovat
 1779 Archibald Montgomerie, 11th Earl of Eglinton
 1780 James Graham, 3rd Duke of Montrose
 1781 Alexander Gordon, 4th Duke of Gordon
 1782 Lord Adam Gordon
 1783 John Murray, 4th Duke of Atholl
 1784 Lord Adam Gordon
 1785 John Murray, 4th Earl of Dunmore
 1786 John Campbell, 1st Marquess of Breadalbane
 1787 Douglas Hamilton, 8th Duke of Hamilton
 1788 Francis Mackenzie, 1st Baron Seaforth
 1789 Francis Stuart, 9th Earl of Moray
 1790 James Duff, 2nd Earl Fife
 1791 Alexander Macdonald, 1st Baron Macdonald
 1792 George Campbell, 6th Duke of Argyll
 1793 George Gordon, 5th Duke of Gordon
 1794 Robert Hay-Drummond, 10th Earl of Kinnoull
 1795 John Murray, 4th Duke of Atholl
 1796 Sir John Sinclair, 1st Baronet
 1797 George Gordon, 9th Marquess of Huntly
 1798 Eric Mackay, 7th Lord Reay
 1799 Henry Dundas, 1st Viscount Melville
 1800 Hector Munro, 8th laird of Novar
 1801 James Forbes, 17th Lord Forbes
 1802 Alexander Macdonald, 2nd Baron Macdonald
 1803 George Gordon, 5th Duke of Gordon
 1804 Alexander Hamilton, 10th Duke of Hamilton
 1805 Archibald Hamilton, 9th Duke of Hamilton
 1806 Prince Augustus Frederick, Duke of Sussex
 1807 Prince Augustus Frederick, Duke of Sussex
 1808 Prince Augustus Frederick, Duke of Sussex
 1809 George Gordon, 5th Duke of Gordon
 1810 George Gordon, 5th Duke of Gordon
 1811 George Gordon, 5th Duke of Gordon
 1812 George Gordon, 5th Duke of Gordon
 1813 Prince Augustus Frederick, Duke of Sussex

Activities

In 1782, the Society was instrumental in securing the repeal of the statutory proscription of Highland Dress introduced after the Jacobite rising of 1745. It has a well known and definitive collection of clan tartans, established in the early 19th century.  In its early days it was active in the investigations into the authenticity of the poems supposedly by Ossian, which it had also helped to publish.

The Society supports and awards annual prizes for piping, including gold medals at the Northern Meeting and Argyllshire Gathering. Its early records are deposited in the National Library of Scotland.

References

External links
 

Music organisations based in the United Kingdom
Scottish clothing
Bagpipe societies
Charities based in London
1778 establishments in Great Britain
Organizations established in 1778